Christine Defraigne (born 1962) is a Belgian politician and a member of the MR. She was the President of the Belgian Senate, in office 2014 to 2018.

Political views
In 2009 Christine Defraigne proposed a nationwide ban of the burqa. She has also called the burkini a "rejection of the freedom of women". Her proposal (together with Joseph Arens) to stop slaughtering animals without anesthesia (like ritual slaughter) resulted in a ban on this practice in Wallonia. She is a feminist.

Criticism

In 2016 she was criticized for wearing a headscarf while visiting Tehran. Her decision to visit the country and wear a hijab was heavily criticized by Iranian born Belgian activist Darya Safai who accused Defraigne of condoning oppressive policies created by the Iranian government. She defended herself saying she "didn't do anything different from what other western prominent women do". She was also accused of having said that the West "has a lot to learn from Islam", but denies that herself.

Notes

1962 births
Living people
Members of the Parliament of the French Community
Members of the Senate (Belgium)
Members of the Parliament of Wallonia
Reformist Movement politicians
Presidents of the Senate (Belgium)
21st-century Belgian politicians
21st-century Belgian women politicians
Belgian senators of the 56th legislature